Cubalaskeya cubana is a species of sea snail, a gastropod in the family Cerithiopsidae. It was described by Rolán and Fernández-Garcés, in 2008.

References

Cerithiopsidae
Gastropods described in 2008